Pseudopotamis is a genus of freshwater snails which have an operculum, aquatic gastropod mollusks in the family Pachychilidae.

Distribution 
It occurs on the Torres Strait Islands.

A sister group (the closest relative) of Pseudopotamis is genus Tylomelania. Pseudopotamis and Tylomelania split in the Middle Miocene c. 19.5 Mya.

Species 
Species within the genus Pseudopotamis include:
 Pseudopotamis semoni Martens, 1894
 Pseudopotamis supralirata (E. A. Smith, 1887) - synonym: Pseudopotamis finschi Martens, 1894 - type species

Description 
Pallial oviduct evolved into an uterine brood (that release shelled juvenile snails).

Ecology
Species in the genus Pseudopotamis are ovoviviparous.

References

External links 

Pachychilidae